Isochrone may refer to:
 Stellar isochrone, the curve on the Hertzsprung–Russell diagram representing stars of the same age
Isochrone curve, the curve (a cycloid) for which objects starting at different points finish at the same time and point when released
Isochrone map, shows areas related to isochrones between different points